Quasimodo is the title character in Victor Hugo's novel The Hunchback of Notre Dame.

Quasimodo may also refer to:

 Quasimodo (magazine), a University of Notre Dame Australia student newspaper
 Quasimodo (comics), a Marvel Comics supervillain
 Quasimodo (Disney), Disney's version of Victor Hugo's character from 1996's The Hunchback of Notre Dame
 Quasimodo (music venue), a jazz club  in Berlin, Germany
 Quasimodo Sunday, another name for the Octave of Easter

People
 Maria Cumani Quasimodo (1908–1995), Italian actress and dancer
 Salvatore Quasimodo (1901–1968), Italian author

See also 
 Quasimoto,  side project of American hip hop producer Madlib (born 1973)